Uirá de Oliveira Marques (born 22 July 1993) commonly known as Uirá, is a Brazilian footballer who plays as a defender.

References

External links
 

1993 births
Living people
Brazilian footballers
Brazilian expatriate footballers
Association football defenders
Madureira Esporte Clube players
Sampaio Corrêa Futebol Clube players
Goytacaz Futebol Clube players
FK Velež Mostar players
NK TOŠK Tešanj players
Muaither SC players
Campeonato Brasileiro Série B players
Campeonato Brasileiro Série C players
Premier League of Bosnia and Herzegovina players
Qatari Second Division players
Expatriate footballers in Bosnia and Herzegovina
Expatriate footballers in Qatar
Brazilian expatriate sportspeople in Bosnia and Herzegovina
Brazilian expatriate sportspeople in Qatar
People from Camaçari
Sportspeople from Bahia